Emperor Zhezong of Song (4 January 1077 – 23 February 1100), personal name Zhao Xu, was the seventh emperor of the Song dynasty of China. His original personal name was Zhao Yong but he changed it to "Zhao Xu" after his coronation. He reigned from 1085 until his death in 1100, and was succeeded by his younger half-brother, Emperor Huizong, because his son died prematurely.

Emperor Zhezong was the sixth son of Emperor Shenzong. He ascended the throne at the age of nine under the supervision of his grandmother, Grand Empress Dowager Gao.

Reign 
As the young emperor's regent, Grand Empress Dowager Gao appointed conservatives such as Sima Guang as Chancellor, who halted the New Policies set forth by Wang Anshi before dying in 1086. Emperor Zhezong was powerless and it was not until Grand Empress Dowager Gao's death in 1093 that the emperor was able to reinstate Wang Anshi's reforms and reduce the late Sima Guang's influence.

Emperor Zhezong lowered taxes, stopped negotiations with the Tangut-led Western Xia state, and resumed armed conflict which eventually forced Western Xia to enter a more peaceful stance with the Song Empire. However, Emperor Zhezong was unable to stop fighting between conservative members of his government and the more liberal members who supported Wang Anshi's reforms and in fact, the fighting intensified during Emperor Zhezong's reign. This split would eventually contribute to the Northern Song dynasty's demise in the 12th century.

On May 18, 1099, Zhezong became ill in which the symptoms were constant coughing and constipation. Zhezong did not get any better, even though he had taken many medications and so Zhezong asked his councilors to recommend physicians. Geng Yu, an physician who was recommended advised Zhezong and even though Zhezong followed his directions, there were no signs of him getting better.

On July, his constipation was replaced by severe diarrhea  and Zhezong could not get up from his bed to receive medicine. Geng recommended spleen-warming pills, an action Zhezong's mother supported.

The coolness of the weather improved Zhezong's health; making him well enough to attend the celebration of his son Zhao Mao on August 8. But his illness returned so Zhezong cancelled his audiences for two days. When he saw his councillors on August 14, he told them that Geng gave him medicine to induce vomiting. He was slightly better but his appetite was gone and his belly constantly ached. Zhezong attended the banquet in honor of his son, in which he was in a very good mood and that his younger brother Zhao Ji also attended. However, Zhao Mao became sick. Zhezong, now in a bad mood due to his son's illness told his councillors that the royal doctors were treating Zhao Mao. On September 26, Zhao Mao was getting better but soon died making Zhezong cancelling his audiences for three days. His birthday was a great celebration but was cut short when after the birthday party, he fell ill and was vomiting all day long. He also contracted laryngitis and could only speak with great effort. By December 21, Zhezong was close to death; he had a weak pulse.

Emperor Zhezong died on February 23, 1100, in Kaifeng at the age of 23 and was succeeded by his younger brother, Emperor Huizong.

Family
Consorts and issue:
 Empress Zhaoci, of the Meng clan (1073–1131)
 Princess Xunmei (1094–1096), first daughter
 Empress Zhaohuai, of the Liu clan (1078–1113), personal name Qingjing
 Princess Shushen (1096–1164), third daughter
 Married Pan Zhengfu (d. 1153) in 1112, and had issue (three sons)
 Princess Chunmei (1097–1099), fourth daughter
 Zhao Mao, Crown Prince Xianmin (1099), first son
 Unknown
 Princess Shuhe (d. 1117), second daughter
 Married Shi Duanli in 1110

Ancestry

See also
 Chinese emperors family tree (middle)
 List of emperors of the Song dynasty
 Architecture of the Song dynasty
 Culture of the Song dynasty
 Economy of the Song dynasty
 History of the Song dynasty
 Society of the Song dynasty
 Technology of the Song dynasty
 Wang Anshi
 Sima Guang

References

 

[aged 23]

Northern Song emperors
11th-century Chinese monarchs
Child monarchs from Asia
People from Kaifeng
1077 births
1100 deaths
Chinese reformers